Robeks is a smoothie franchise chain headquartered in Los Angeles, California, USA. Founded in 1996 by David Robertson, a former investment banker,  as of January 2021, the company has 83 franchise locations.

Background 
Peter Bickford was a Wall Street banker and his wife Katrina ran a landscape design business. They were introduced to Robeks by Kela Alstrup, a franchise broker. The Bickfords "were hooked by the idea of providing healthy food in a colorful, high energy setting." The Bickfords opened the first Robeks franchise in New England.

In 2017, Robeks introduced a new menu. In February 2018, Robeks launched their new Online Ordering program allowing customers to place orders from their desktop or mobile devices. The cornerstone of the program is a new mobile app that is now available to the public. In the summer of 2018, Robeks introduced three floral infused lemonades in anticipation of the summer heat: Rose, Hibiscus, and Lavender.

References

https://www.franchising.com/news/20180320_robeks_primed_for_growth_in_2018.html

https://www.qsrmagazine.com/news/robeks-fresh-juices-and-smoothies-launches-online-ordering

https://www.qsrmagazine.com/news/robeks-unveils-3-floral-infused-lemonades-summer

https://losangeles.cbslocal.com/2018/03/20/where-to-eat-the-best-acai-bowls-in-la/

https://www.pymnts.com/mobile-order-ahead/2018/personalization-robeks-qsr/

External links
 Robeks

1996 establishments in California
American companies established in 1996
Food and drink companies based in Los Angeles
Fast-food chains of the United States
Fast-food franchises
Juice bars
Regional restaurant chains in the United States
Smoothie chains in the United States
Restaurants established in 1996